The 1950 European Figure Skating Championships were held at the Bislett Stadium in Oslo, Norway from February 17 to 19. Elite senior-level figure skaters from European ISU member nations competed for the title of European Champion in the disciplines of men's singles, ladies' singles, and pair skating.

Results

Men

Ladies

Pairs

References

External links
 results

European Figure Skating Championships, 1950
European Figure Skating Championships, 1950
European Figure Skating Championships
International figure skating competitions hosted by Norway
International sports competitions in Oslo
1950s in Oslo
European Figure Skating Championships